WHRR-LP (96.1 FM) is a defunct radio station formerly licensed to Portsmouth, Ohio, United States. The station was owned by Holy Redeemer Church and broadcast a religious format. The station was one of the first LPFM radio stations licensed in Ohio by the FCC.

On June 18, 2012, the licensee requested that the station's license be cancelled and its call sign was deleted from the Federal Communications Commission's database.

References

External links
 
 Diocese of Columbus

Defunct religious radio stations in the United States
HRR-LP
HRR-LP
Radio stations disestablished in 2012
Defunct radio stations in the United States
2012 disestablishments in Ohio
HRR-LP